Do As Infinity: Final is the last live-recorded concert of Japanese band Do As Infinity before they disbanded in 2005. It took place in Budokan on November 25, 2005. The third disc contains bonus tracks featuring various live recorded songs from Do As Infinity's past live shows.

Track listing

Disc one
 SE
 "New World"
 
 "Oasis"
 "Nice & Easy"
 MC
 
 
 
 "Rumble Fish"
 MC
 
 "Week!"
 MC
 "Desire"
 
 "Under the Moon"

Disc two
 
 
 
 "Yesterday & Today"
 MC
 "For the Future"
 "Under the Sun"
 
 "One or Eight"
 
 "We Are."
 MC -encore 1-
 "Field of Dreams" -encore 1-
 "TAO" -encore 1-
 MC -encore 1-
 "Summer Days" -encore 1-

Disc three
 MC -encore 2-
 "Wings"
 MC -encore 2-
 "Heart"
 MC -encore 2-
 "Tangerine Dream"
 MC -encore 2-
 
Bonus Tracks
 "Tangerine Dream" (FREE LIVE 100 -99.11.22- Shibuya Kōkaidō)
 "Raven" (FREE LIVE 100 -99.11.22- Shibuya Kōkaidō)
 "Oasis" (FREE LIVE 100 -99.11.22- Shibuya Kōkaidō)
 "Painful" (Do As Infinity Live Tour 2001 - 01.05.27 Shibuya-Ax)
 "Welcome!" (Do As Infinity Live Tour 2001 - 01.05.27 Shibuya-Ax)
 "Holiday" (Do As Infinity Live Tour 2001 - 01.05.27 Shibuya-Ax)
 "Under the Sun" (A-Nation 2002 -02.09.01- Odaiba)
 "Be Free" (Do As Infinity LIVE TOUR 2005 ~NEED YOUR LOVE~ -05.05.31- Budokan)
 "Robot" (Do As Infinity LIVE TOUR 2005 ~NEED YOUR LOVE~ -05.05.31- Budokan)
 "Need Your Love" (Do As Infinity LIVE TOUR 2005 ~NEED YOUR LOVE~ -05.05.31- Budokan)
 "Glasses" (Do As Infinity LIVE TOUR 2005 ~NEED YOUR LOVE~ -05.05.31- Budokan)

DVD
A live DVD entitled Do As Infinity: Final chronicling the band's final concert on November 25, 2005, in Tokyo's Nippon Budokan was released on March 15, 2006. 15,000 fans were listening to the band as they performed together for a last time until they reformed in 2008. Special guests were Dai Nagao and former bassist Michitaro.

Track listing
"New World"
"Tōku Made"
"Oasis"
"Nice & Easy"
-MC-
"Hi no Ataru Sakamichi"
"Rakuen"
"Hiiragi"
"Rumble Fish"
-MC-
"Tsurezure Naru Mama ni"
-MC-
"Week!"
-MC-
(Michitaro's appearance)
"Desire"
"Shinjitsu no Uta"
"Under the Moon"
-MC-
"Mahou no Kotoba ~Would you marry me?~"
(Michitaro leaving)
"Kūsō Ryodan"
"Fukai Mori"
"Kagaku no Yoru"
"Yesterday & Today"
-MC-
"For the Future"
"Under the Sun"
"Boukensha Tachi"
-Call & response-
"One or Eight"
"Honjitsu wa Seiten Nari"
"We Are."
-MC-

Encore
"Field of Dreams"
"TAO"
"Summer Days"
-MC-
-Dai Nagao's appearance-
-Dai, Ryo, Ban-chan (just three of them)
"Wings"
"Heart"
-Dai, Ryo, Ban-chan, GTB-
"Tangerine Dream"
-MC-
"Ai no Uta"

Chart positions

1 CD version

External links
 Do As Infinity: Final at Avex Network

Do As Infinity albums
2006 live albums
2006 video albums
Live video albums
Avex Group live albums
Avex Group video albums
Albums recorded at the Nippon Budokan